Laan may refer to:

 7de Laan, South African Afrikaans soap opera.
 Van der Laan, Dutch toponymic surname.
 Ana Laan, Spanish singer.
 Marta Laan, Estonian actress.
 Laan (film), 2011 short film directed by Lula Ali Ismaïl

Estonian-language surnames